Valdosta Mall is an enclosed shopping mall  located in Valdosta, Georgia, United States.

Belk, and JCPenney, are the mall's anchor stores. The wing featuring JCPenney was part of a 1985 expansion.
An Additional Vacant Anchor was previously a Sears which closed in 2018.
In 2006, an outdoor concourse was added to the mall's front face, bringing in Old Navy, PetSmart, Office Depot and Ross Dress For Less as junior anchors.  In 2007, the JCPenney store expanded greatly, taking over some of the space vacated when the old movie theater moved across the street.

The mall was formerly known as Colonial Mall Valdosta under the ownership of Colonial Properties Trust who sold the mall to Gregory Greenfield and Associates in 2007. The mall is currently owned by GEM Realty Capital.

In 2015, the Office Depot was replaced with a Bed Bath & Beyond.

On November 2, 2017, it was announced that Sears would be closing as part of a plan to close 63 stores nationwide. The store closed in January 2018.

Sometime in December 2018, the FYE store in the mall announced its closing, and a storewide discount of 30-50% began. It is closed completely as of January 22, 2019.

As of July 1, 2019, Valdosta Mall is managed by Spinoso Real Estate Group.

List of anchor stores

References

External links 
 
Valdosta Mall
Valdosta Mall on Twitter

Valdosta, Georgia
Buildings and structures in Lowndes County, Georgia
Shopping malls in Georgia (U.S. state)
Shopping malls established in 1983
CBL Properties
Tourist attractions in Lowndes County, Georgia